Anita de Montemar, is a Mexican telenovela produced by Valentín Pimstein and originally transmitted by Teleprogramas Acapulco, SA.

Cast 
 Amparo Rivelles as Anita de Montemar
 Raúl Ramírez as Ingeniero Carlos Miranda
 Irma Lozano as Alicia Miranda de Montemar
 Magda Guzmán as Carlota
 Sara García
 Carlos Navarro
 María Eugenia Ríos as Ofelia
 Jorge Lavat as Héctor
 Jorge Mateos
 Fernando Mendoza
 Tara Parra as Catalina Rivas
 Carlos Bracho as Dr. Mendoza
 Mercedes Pascual as Conchita
 Josefina Escobedo as Constanza
 Miguel Suárez as Sr. Mercado

References

External links 

Mexican telenovelas
Televisa telenovelas
Spanish-language telenovelas
1967 telenovelas
1967 Mexican television series debuts
1967 Mexican television series endings